David L. Chicoine is an American university administrator and businessman.

Biography

Early life
David Chicoine was born in Elk Point, South Dakota. He graduated from South Dakota State University, where he was a member of Lambda Chi Alpha fraternity. He also received an M.S. from the University of Delaware, an M.A. from Western Illinois University, and a Ph.D. from the University of Illinois at Urbana-Champaign.

Career
He was head of the Department of Agricultural Economics and Dean of the College of Agriculture, Consumer and Environmental Sciences at the University of Illinois at Urbana-Champaign. From 2001 to 2006, he served as senior officer for technology commercialization and economic development for the Urbana-Champaign, and for six months as interim vice president for academic affairs. He served on the board of directors of the John Warner Bank, the Carle Foundation Hospital, the Farm Foundation, the DuPage International Technology Park, the Illinois Technology Development Fund, and the Argonne National Laboratory.

He has served as the president of South Dakota State University since January 1, 2007. He has served as a director on the board of directors of Monsanto since April 15, 2009, and sits on the board of directors of First Bank & Trust, Brookings, SD.

He sits on the board of trustees of the Avera McKennan Hospital and the University Health Center. He is a Knight of the National Order of Merit of France, and he has received the United States Department of Agriculture Superior Service Award and the Distinguished Alumnus Award from the SDSU Department of Economics.

Personal life
He is married to Marcia Chicoine, and they have a son, Josh, who lives in Chicago.

Bibliography

Academic articles
 
 
 
 
  Pdf.
 
 
 
 
 
  Pdf.

Books

References

Living people
People from Elk Point, South Dakota
Businesspeople from Chicago
South Dakota State University alumni
University of Delaware alumni
Western Illinois University alumni
University of Illinois Urbana-Champaign alumni
Knights of the Ordre national du Mérite
Presidents of South Dakota State University
Year of birth missing (living people)